Bayan Jumah is a Syrian swimmer from Aleppo who specializes in butterfly and freestyle events. An ISG silver medalist and Syrian national champion and record-holder. Jumah is the fastest female swimmer in Syria.

At the 2008 Summer Olympics, she withdrew from a heat in the 50 metre freestyle in which she would have faced Olympian Anya Gostomelsky, refusing to swim alongside an Israeli. Gostomelsky set a new Israeli national record in the race. Asked what her reaction was, Gostomelsky said: "I didn't notice that the lane was empty. That's her problem."

At the 2012 Summer Olympics, she competed in the Women's 100 metre freestyle, finishing in 40th place overall out of 48 swimmers in the first round heats, failing to qualify for the second round.

She also competed at the 2016 Summer Olympics in the Women's 50 m freestyle and finished 49th with a time of 26.41 seconds.

Career

The First Syrian female swimmer to be qualified to the Olympic Games Rio 2016.

She was a participant  with the Olympic Channel in Athletes Under Fire episodes.

https://olympics.com/en/video/syria-s-only-female-olympic-swimmer-inspires-a-new-generation

• Olympic participation 

- 2016 Rio de Janeiro Olympic Games.

- 2012 London Olympic Games.

- 2010 Singapore Youth Olympic Games.

- 2008  Beijing Olympic Games.

• Participation in the World Championships:

- In 2019 Wuhan.

- In 2017 Budapest.

- In 2015  Kazan.

- In 2013 Barcelona.

- In 2011 China.

- In 2009 Rome.

• Participation in World Cup Series:

- In 2015 Dubai WCS and she got a bronze medal in team relay.

- In 2015 Qatar WCS.

- In 2011 Dubai WCS.

- In 2010 Dubai WCS.

• Participation in the Asian Games:

- In 2017 She took part at Uzbekistan Asian AG Championships and she got two gold medals in 50 and 100 M FS, and a silver medal in 200 M FS.

- In 2014 Inchon Asian Games in Korea.

- In 2010 Guangzhou Asian Games in China.

- In 2009 Asian Youth Games in Singapore.

•Participations on Arab Level:

- In 2010  the Arab Schools Swimming Championship in Lebanon she got two gold and one silver medals in 50M, 100M and 200M free style.

- In 2009 the Arab Junior and Youth Swimming Championship in Jordan she got two silver medals.

- In 2008 Arab School Swimming Championship in Jordan she got a silver and bronze medals in 50 M and 100 M free style.

- In 2007 the Arab Swimming Championship in Morocco she got two gold and one silver medals in 50 M, 100 M and 200 M free style.

•Participation on International Level:

- In 2017 She took part at Hradec Králové Grand Prix in Czech Republic and she  got a gold medal in 50 M FS and a silver medal in 100 M FS.

- In 2015 She took part in Dubai International Swimming Championship and she got one gold medal in 50M F.S and two silver medals in 100M and 200M F.S.

- In 2014 She took part in Dubai International Swimming Championship and she got seven medals in different disciplines.

- In 2013 she took  part in Dubai International Swimming Championship and she got three gold medals in 50M, 100M and 200M F.S, two silver medals in 50M Beast stroke and Relay.

- In 2013 She took part in the Islamic Solidarity Sport Games in Indonesia and she got a bronze medal in 200M F.S.

See also
Boycotts of Israel in individual sports
List of Syrian records in swimming

References

Syrian female swimmers
Living people
Olympic swimmers of Syria
Swimmers at the 2008 Summer Olympics
Swimmers at the 2012 Summer Olympics
Swimmers at the 2016 Summer Olympics
Syrian female freestyle swimmers
Swimmers at the 2010 Summer Youth Olympics
Swimmers at the 2010 Asian Games
Swimmers at the 2014 Asian Games
Sportspeople from Aleppo
1994 births
Asian Games competitors for Syria
21st-century Syrian women